Sir Erik Dammann (born 9 May 1931 in Oslo) is a Norwegian author, environmentalist and government scholar. He is mostly known for founding of the Norwegian-based organization, The Future in Our Hands (Framtiden i våre hender). In 1982, he was awarded the Right Livelihood Award for "challenging Western values and lifestyles in order to promote a more responsible attitude to the environment and the third world". In 2011 he was knighted by The Royal Norwegian Order of Saint Olav,the highest civilian honour conferred by Norway.

Biography
He is educated within advertising.

Dammann's book The Future in Our Hands raised social and environmental questions and put them in a much larger perspective than until then had been the norm. Inspired by the interest for this book, in 1974  he initiated Framtiden i våre hender, today a world wide organisation with thirty partner organisations over the globe. In 1978, the organization  established The Development Fund (Utviklingsfondet). In 2003, The Development Fund established a youth-based affiliate, Spire.
 
Dammann is also known for his stay on the island of Samoa, described in the book With four children in a palm hut (1968), and also for starting the movement Project Alternative Future and Forum for System Debate. His book Behind time and space (1987) was described as the first introduction of New Age philosophy in Norway. In advertising in the early 70’s he contributed strongly in the introduction of the orange “S” as a square in the logo for Co-op Norway. 

In 1982 he received The Right Livelihood Award, "...for challenging Western values and lifestyles in order to promote a more responsible attitude to the environment and the third world." Since 1988 Dammann has been a recipient of a Lifetime Government grant. His books have been translated to nine languages.

Bibliography
1966 Truls and Tone the Magician, an adventure in reality
1968 With four children in a palm hut
1972 The Future in Our Hands
1972 Adoption?
1976 New lifestyle, and then what?
1977 The parties at separation point (together with Jacob Bomann-Larsen)
1979 Revolution in the affluent society
1980 You decide!
1981 Free thoughts
1982 Talofa Samoa!
1987 Behind time and space
1989 Money or your life!
1998 Kidnapped (together with Ragnhild Dammann)
2005 Contrasts, an account of a varied life (self biography)

References

Other sources
The Big Norwegian One Volume Encyclopedia Kunnskapsforlaget (Knowledge Publishing. 2006)

External links
The Future in Our Hands homepage
The Right Livelihood Award

Norwegian male writers
Norwegian environmentalists
Degrowth advocates
Writers from Oslo
1931 births
Living people